Larry Bogdanow (February 24, 1947 – June 29, 2011) was an American restaurant architect.

Early life and education
Born in Houston, Texas, Bogdanow graduated from Washington University in St. Louis, Missouri, in 1970.

He moved to New York City and studied architecture at the Pratt Institute in Brooklyn, New York, where he earned a bachelor's degree in 1977.

Career
He began his career working for the architectural firm Beyer Blinder Belle, but quickly left to establish his own firm, New City Designs, in 1978. That firm eventually became Bogdanow Partners Architects.

His firm became known for designing the architecture for several well-known restaurants in New York City, including the Union Square Cafe and many others including Savoy, Cub Room, Atlas, Follonico, Kelley & Ping, City Hall, Kin Khao, Union Pacific and The Screening Room. Outside of New York, his firm was responsible for the design of Rubicon in San Francisco, Lexington Square Cafe in Westchester and Adagio in Chicago.

Death
Bogdanow died of a brain tumor on June 29, 2011 in Manhattan, aged 64.

See also

 List of American architects
 List of people from Houston
 List of people from New York City
 List of Pratt Institute alumni
 List of Washington University alumni

References

1947 births
2011 deaths
20th-century American architects
21st-century American architects
American company founders
Architects from New York City
Architects from Texas
Deaths from brain cancer in the United States
Architects from Houston
Pratt Institute alumni
Washington University in St. Louis alumni